Trocaire College is a private Roman Catholic college in Buffalo, New York. Founded in 1958 by the Sisters of Mercy, Trocaire College offers associate and bachelor's degree programs as well as one-year certificate programs and workforce development training in healthcare, business, and technology.  It is accredited by the Middle States Commission on Higher Education and chartered by the Board of Regents of the University of the State of New York. It has an extension site known as the Trocaire Achievement Complex located in Williamsville, New York. Total enrollment across both locations is approximately 1300 students.

History
Trocaire was founded in 1958 by the Sisters of Mercy as Sancta Maria College, to train women of the order. In 1965 it accepted in laywomen and in 1972 it accepted male students. In 1967 the college was renamed Trocaire College. The word Trócaire means Mercy in the Irish language; the Sisters of Mercy were founded in Ireland, and this name recognizes that Irish heritage.

Academics
Trocaire College offers certificate, Associate's degree, and Bachelor's degree programs in healthcare, business and technology. It focuses on offering career-oriented programs in growing fields. The college is home to the oldest private Associate's Degree in Nursing program in western New York.

References

External links

Former women's universities and colleges in the United States
Education in Buffalo, New York
Two-year colleges in the United States
Sisters of Mercy colleges and universities
Educational institutions established in 1958
Association of Catholic Colleges and Universities
Universities and colleges in Erie County, New York
Catholic universities and colleges in New York (state)
1958 establishments in New York (state)